Corymbia variegata is a tree found in eastern Australia belonging to the Myrtaceae family. It occurs in north eastern New South Wales from around Coffs Harbour to near Monto and the Carnarvon Range in Queensland. Usually seen in open forest on soils of medium fertility, often in hilly country. A member of the spotted gum complex of trees, it grows up to 50 metres tall.

, Plants of the World Online treats the species as synonymous with Corymbia citriodora.

References

variegata
Myrtales of Australia
Flora of New South Wales
Flora of Queensland
Trees of Australia